Šulskis is a Lithuanian surname that may refer to
Rimantas Šulskis (1943–1995), Lithuanian sculptor and painter
Šarūnas Šulskis (born 1972), Lithuanian chess player
Vytautas Šulskis (born 1988), Lithuanian basketball player

Lithuanian-language surnames